The All-domain Anomaly Resolution Office (AARO) is an office within the United States Office of the Secretary of Defense that investigates unidentified flying objects (UFOs) and other phenomena in the air, sea, and/or space and/or on land: sometimes referred to as "unidentified aerial phenomena," "unidentified anomalous phenomena," or "U.A.P."

The Unidentified Aerial Phenomena Task Force (UAPTF) was a program within the Office of Naval Intelligence used to "standardize collection and reporting" of sightings of UFOs. UAPTF was detailed in a June 2020 hearing of the United States Senate Select Committee on Intelligence. The UAPTF issued a preliminary report in June 2021. In July 2022 it was announced that the UAPTF would be succeeded as an organization by AARO.

Findings

On April 12, 2021, the Pentagon confirmed the authenticity of pictures and videos gathered by the Task Force, purportedly showing "what appears to be pyramid-shaped objects" hovering above  in 2019, off the coast of California, with spokeswoman Susan Gough saying "I can confirm that the referenced photos and videos were taken by Navy personnel. The UAPTF has included these incidents in their ongoing examinations."

The following month, Gough further confirmed a second video had been recorded by Navy personnel and is under review by the Task Force.

Assessments

Science writer Mick West has argued that the pyramid images in the video were most likely an airplane, Jupiter, or stars that were distorted when the lens was out of focus. West said the Navy video is an example of a photographic effect called bokeh, and demonstrated the effect by recreating similar pyramid images on video. 

On June 25, 2021, the Office of the Director of National Intelligence released a report on UAPs, commonly known as the Pentagon UFO Report. The report found that the UAPTF was unable to identify 143 of 144 objects spotted between 2004 and 2021. The report said that 18 of these featured unusual movement patterns or flight characteristics, and that more analysis was needed to determine if those sightings represented breakthrough technology. The report said that some of these steps are resource-intensive and would require additional investment. The report did not link the sightings to extraterrestrial life, with officials saying "We have no clear indications that there is any nonterrestrial explanation for them — but we will go wherever the data takes us".

In December 2022, Under Secretary of Defense for Intelligence and Security Ronald Moultrie said that "[w]e have not seen anything that would lead us [...] to believe that any of the objects we have seen are of alien origin," and that many of the reported objects may be "balloons and things like UAVs that are operated for purposes other than surveillance or intelligence collection." When asked about the 143 out of 144 military encounters with mysterious flying objects – including several which appeared to demonstrate extraordinary technology – director of national intelligence Avril Haines said, "There's always the question of 'is there something else that we simply do not understand, that might come extraterrestrially". After speaking with several of the naval aviators who observed one of the unknown crafts, Administrator of NASA Bill Nelson said he is convinced that the pilots "saw something, and their radars locked onto it." When asked to speculate about the nature of the phenomena, Nelson responded, "Who am I to say that planet Earth is the only location of a life form that is civilized and organized like ours?".

Reactions 

Writing for Politico, Bryan Bender quoted Christopher Mellon, an advisor to the company To the Stars, as saying "It further legitimizes the issue", adding "That in itself is extremely important. People can talk about it without fear of embarrassment." Mellon also said, "We are talking dozens of incidents in restricted military airspace over years."

In July 2020, United States Senator Marco Rubio stated that he was worried that an adversary country had achieved "some technological leap" that "allows them to conduct this sort of activity", while also saying that there might be a conventional explanation that was "boring".

In a piece originally published in Newsweek, astrophysicist Adam Frank wrote "if it's handled well, the [UAP] commission could do more than shed much-needed light on UAPs. It could also give Americans a masterclass in the most basic, most important, and unfortunately, most boring topic in science: Standards of Evidence" and that "when it comes to UAPS/UFOs there are no such standards. It's just a free-for-all."

Organization
AARO's Executive Council is AAROEXEC. The director of AARO is Sean M. Kirkpatrick, reporting to the USD(I&S), Ronald Moultrie.

AARO will focus on
Surveillance, Collection and Recording, 
System Capabilities and Design, 
Intelligence Operations and Analysis, 
Mitigation and Defeat, 
Governance, 
Science and Technology

Resourcing will be visible at the Program Budget Review process (PBR); USD(I&S) are to invite participation of Principals from the Office of the Director of National Intelligence. It is to continue the collection and reporting of Unidentified Aerial Phenomena (UAP) incidents across the DoD's Special use airspace (SUA), as well as the collection and reporting of anomalous, unidentified space, airborne, submerged, and transmedium objects. AARO is to identify and reduce gaps in operational, intelligence, and counterintelligence capability, and to recommend changes in policy, whether regulatory of statutory, to reduce those gaps.

History

UAPTF
In December 2017, the United States Department of Defense confirmed the existence of a defense program used to collect data on military UFO sightings, despite the disbandment of the Advanced Aerospace Threat Identification Program in 2012. Like its predecessor program, the UAP Task Force is managed by the Under Secretary of Defense for Intelligence in collaboration with the Office of Naval Intelligence. 

After the June 2020 Senate hearing, Senator Marco Rubio requested the release of video footage of unexplained aerial vehicles collected by the United States Navy, including the Pentagon UFO videos.

On June 24, 2020, the Intelligence Committee voted to require United States Intelligence Community and the United States Department of Defense to publicly track and analyze data collected on unexplained aerial vehicles. A report from the task force will be issued to the Intelligence Committee 180 days after the passage of the intelligence authorization act.

The program was officially approved on August 4, 2020, by the Deputy Secretary of Defense David Norquist, and announced on August 14, 2020. "The mission of the task force is to detect, analyze and catalog UAPs that could potentially pose a threat to U.S. national security."

Brennan McKernan was director of the UAPTF.

AARO
 (NDAA 2022 and NDAA 2023) directs the Secretary and DNI to establish an office to carry out the duties of the UAPTF. 

The successor to the UAPTF was established on 23 November 2021, as the Airborne Object Identification and Management Synchronization Group (AOIMSG).  Oversight and direction of the AOIMSG was to be an Executive Council, formerly the Airborne Object Identification and Management Executive Council (AOIMEXEC). The AOIMEXEC was to be co-chaired by the Under Secretary of Defense for Intelligence and Security (USD(I&S)), and the Director of Operations, Joint Staff, and was to designate an acting director for the AOIMSG.

On 20 July 2022 DoD announced the successors to AOIMSG and AOIMEXEC to be AARO and AAROEXEC, respectively. AARO is the All-domain Anomaly Resolution Office. The UAPTF is disestablished. The Department of the Navy's resources in the UAPTF are transferred to AARO.  AAROEXEC is to manage the transition of the Unidentified Aerial Phenomena Task Force to the AARO.

 (2022 omnibus) requires quarterly classified reporting to Congress beginning no later than 13 June 2022.

References

Further reading 
 "Preliminary Assessment: Unidentified Aerial Phenomena" - Unclassified intelligence assessment by DoD on the progress of the UAPTF

External links 
 Department of Defence press release regarding the UAPTF
 Department of Defense press release regarding the AOIMSG
 Department of Defense press release regarding the AARO
 .

Government responses to UFOs
UFO culture in the United States
Office of Naval Intelligence
United States intelligence operations
Non-combat military operations involving the United States
2020 establishments in the United States